Gustav Karl "Guus" Dräger (14 December 1917 – 24 May 1989) was a Dutch association football player, who played as a winger for SDW, DWS, Ajax, IJ.V.V. Stormvogels and for the Netherlands national team.

Club career
Dräger began his football career in the youth ranks of ASC SDW in Amsterdam, playing one season before moving to AFC DWS in 1937 at the age of 19. In 1941 Dräger transferred to AFC Ajax where he played in 207 matches and scoring 80 goals within a decade (1941-1951). He ended his career in 1953 with IJ.V.V. Stormvogels, playing amateur football for EVC from Edam afterwards.

In 1961 he became the manager for BFC from Bussum.

International career
He was also a member of the Netherlands national football team. Between 1939 and 1948 he played in 13 matches, scoring 5 goals for the Dutch national team. He was also part of the Dutch squad for the 1948 Summer Olympics, but he did not play in any matches.

References

External links
 

 Guus Dräger statistics at Voetbalstats.nl

1917 births
1989 deaths
Association football wingers
Footballers from Amsterdam
Dutch footballers
Netherlands international footballers
AFC DWS players
AFC Ajax players
Olympic footballers of the Netherlands
Footballers at the 1948 Summer Olympics